The Train is a 1970 Indian Hindi-language thriller film starring Rajesh Khanna, Nanda. It is a remake of the 1967 Malayalam film Cochin Express.

Plot 
Khanna stars as Police Inspector Shyam Kumar, who sets out to solve a series of murders which have all taken place on a train. Complicating the situation are his girlfriend Neeta (Nanda), who has been acting mysteriously ever since she began her new job, and hotel dancer Miss Lily (Helen), who tries to seduce the good police inspector, but may find that she loses her heart instead.

Cast 

Rajesh Khanna as CID Inspector Shyam Kumar
Nanda as Neeta / Geeta
Helen as Lily
Rajendra Nath as Pyarelal
Iftekhar As Police Commissioner
Madan Puri as Yogi / No. 1
M. B. Shetty as Shetty
Mumtaz Begum as Neeta's Mother
 Chaman Puri as Neeta's father Ramdev
Sunder as Hiralal jeweller
Ranveer Raj as Inspector Kapoor
Mamaji as Stationmaster
 Randhir as Peshomal Lodhani Diamond dealer
 Gurnam Singh as the waiter
 Chinu Rajput as the Male dancer in song "O Meri Jaan Maine Kahan"
 Harbans Darshan M. Arora as Inspector in Nasik police station
 Aruna Irani as dancer in song "Chaiyaan Re Chaiyaan"
 Shammi as Geeta the matron of Young girls hostel
 Rajpal as Anokhe Lal (The Boss)

Production 
The Train was co-produced by Rajendra Kumar and it was Nanda who suggested Rajendra to cast Rajesh Khanna in the main lead.

Soundtrack 
The film is famous for the evergreen song "Kis Liye Maine Pyar Kiya", sung by Lata Mangeshkar and the peppy number "Gulabi Aankhen", sung by Mohammed Rafi, which continues to get remixed and recreated to this day. These took inspiration from the 1940 Hollywood film Midnight Limited. The lyrics were written by Anand Bakshi

Reception 
The Train was recorded as a "Hit" at Box Office India. This film is counted among the 17 consecutive hit films of Rajesh Khanna between 1969 and 1971, by adding the two-hero films Marayada and Andaz to the 15 consecutive solo hits he gave from 1969 to 1971.

References

External links 
 

1970 films
1970s Hindi-language films
1970s mystery thriller films
1970s spy thriller films
Films scored by R. D. Burman
Films set on trains
Hindi remakes of Malayalam films
Indian mystery thriller films
Indian spy thriller films
Rose Audio Visuals
Films directed by Ravikant Nagaich